Carey Lovelace is an American art journalist, playwright, curator, and producer based in New York.

Early life and education
Lovelace was born in Los Angeles and grew up in Whittier, California. She studied theatre at Interlochen Arts Academy. At California Institute of the Arts, she received a BFA, majoring in ethnomusicology, music composition, and writing; she studied composing with James Tenney, Harold Budd, and Leonard Stein. She toured Europe with the mixed media avant-garde group Simultaneous Arts and Company, which specialized in musical installations in art galleries and museums.  In Paris for two years, she studied contemporary music at the Université Paris VIII (Saint-Denis Université), and attended the composition classes of Iannis Xenakis (Sorbonne) and Olivier Messiaen (Paris Conservatoire).

Career
Registered as a Broadcast Music, Inc. (BMI) composer, Lovelace has had works performed in Los Angeles, New York, Aspen, Paris, Copenhagen, Holland and over KUSC, ORTF, WBAI.  She co-founded the Los Angeles Symposium of Women Composers and the Independent Composers Association. A 2010 Andrew and Marian Heiskell Visiting Critic at the American Academy of Rome, she was named Co–Commissioner of the US Pavilion at the 2013 Venice Biennale.

Curator
The U.S. State Department appointed Lovelace Co–Commissioner, with Holly Block, Executive Director of The Bronx Museum of the Arts, for the U.S. Pavilion for the 2013 Venice Biennale, with Sarah Sze as the featured artist. In 2010, she curated "Iannis Xenakis:  Composer, Architect, Visionary"; with Sharon Kanach. The exhibition traveled to the Canadian Center for Architecture in Montreal and the Los Angeles Museum of Contemporary Art, the Holland Festival, and the Berlin Akademie der Kunst (Lovelace and Kanach met as students of Xenakis at the Sorbonne). In 2008, Lovelace curated "Making It Together:  Women’s Collaborative Art and Community" at the Bronx Museum of the Arts, exploring feminist visual art and performance collectives of the 1970s.

Art journalism
Inspired by a workshop by John Cage, she moved to New York City and in 1981 enrolled in New York University’s graduate journalism program, where she received a master's degree.  Her first article, "Painting for Dollars,” was published in Harpers Magazine. She continued writing about art for publications including the Los Angeles Times, the Boston Globe, Art News, Arts, Artforum, Ms., The New York Times, and the International Herald Tribune. She wrote regularly for Newsday from 1994 and 1997 and for Art in America from 2000 and 2009.

In 2003, Lovelace became co-president, with Eleanor Heartney, of the International Association of Art Critics, US Chapter, co-organizing a number of large-scale events including the 2005 National Critics Conference in Los Angeles.

Playwright
In the 1990s, Lovelace returned to an initial interest in theatre, getting an MFA in playwrighting from the Actors Studio Program at the New School.  At Ensemble Studio Theatre, she participated in labs under the direction of the late Curt Dempster.  She had over 50 performances in theatres across the country. Couples Counseling, developed at EST, was premiered at REDCAT in Los Angeles, and was performed at 59E59 Theaters in New York and at the Edinburgh Fringe Festival. Her work is featured in The Best Monologues from the Best American Short Plays: Volume One, edited by William W. Demastes.

Producer
In 2009, Lovelace co-founded the theatre company Loose Change Productions, focusing on transcultural theatre and performance that explore new moral and ethical territories.  Its productions include Couples Counseling, Red Mother by Spiderwoman Theater, and Honour by Dipti Mehta.

References

External links
 
 Loose Change Productions
Canadian Centre for Architecture
Berlin Akademie der Kunst
The Bronx Museum of the Arts
AICA-USA.  List of officers.
CalArts.  Couples Counseling Premiere at REDCAT, June 2004.
Canadian Centre for Architecture.  "Sharon Kanach and Carey Lovelace: Iannis Xenakis – Gallery Talk."
Devine, Rachel. "Neurotic, narcissistic... and so New York", The Times, London, 16 August 2009.
Halkiotis, Amanda.  "Couples Counseling: A Review."  New Theater Corps, 6 August 2009.
Mandel, Howard. "JJA among the Critics", Jazzhouse, Los Angeles, 1 June 2005.
Pozo, Carlos M.  "Carl Stone."  Angbase, No. 4, 1999.
Raven, Arlene, Cassandra L. Langer, Joanna Frueh.  Feminist Art Criticism: An Anthology.  HarperCollins Publishers: New York, 1991.
Silver, Jan.  "Take Five 2007."  Dan's Hamptons, 16 November 2007.

Year of birth missing (living people)
Living people
American women journalists
American art critics
American art curators
American women curators
American women critics
American women dramatists and playwrights
21st-century American women
Journalists from California
People from Whittier, California